The Lorraine Hansberry Theatre is an African-American arts institution located in downtown San Francisco.
It is named after Lorraine Hansberry, who wrote A Raisin in the Sun while living in Bay Area. Since being founded in 1981, The Lorraine Hansberry Theatre has mounted productions that have included performances by Ruby Dee, Ossie Davis, Danny Glover and Ntozake Shange.

For 30 years, The Lorraine Hansberry Theatre has celebrated the African-American experience - an American experience - on stage in the San Francisco Bay Area. Described as the most tenacious arts organization in San Francisco, The Lorraine Hansberry Theatre has survived numerous obstacles including a declining African-American population — the San Francisco population has decreased to 6% — and multiple changes in location. The Lorraine Hansberry Theatre has mounted more than 100 plays, productions and theatrical events since its genesis.

Notable productions include the 1987 production of Ntozake Shange's play Three Views of Mt. Fuji, which completed a six-week run at the Lorraine Hansberry Theatre preceding an opening in New York at New Dramatists. In 1991 African-American playwright Robert Alexander challenges the work of Harriet Beecher Stowe with a production at The Lorraine Hansberry Theatre examining stereotypes in the cabin of Uncle Tom.

Change of Venue 
In June 2007, the Lorraine Hansberry Theatre was to loose the YWCA building on 620 Sutter Street where they had conducted business in since 1988. The lease was scheduled to expire at the end of the following month (July 2007) and instead of a renewal, the space was going to be purchase by the Academy of Art University. This arts organisation was planning to continue to use the building as a dormitory, as it had done since 2005. 

A campaign was quickly organised in an attempt to avoid displacement of the theatre. The contacts for Mayor [Gavin Newsom], members of San Francisco’s board of supervisors the president of the Academy of Art, Elisa Stephens was advertised on the theatre’s website in hopes to encourage support for their cause. Approximately 1,300 digital letters of correspondence was counted sent from the theatre’s website to linked contacts and an additional unknown number of physical letters. "The heads of the San Francisco Opera, San Francisco Ballet, San Francisco Symphony, SFMOMA and other major institutions sent a joint letter urging the mayor to take action."

On June 26, The theatre received good news. San Francisco’s Board of Supervisors passed a resolution "supporting the Lorraine Hansberry and its contributions to the cultural life of San Francisco" with a unanimous vote of all 10 members present.

The Lorraine Hansberry Theatre was finally able to settle down after consecutive years without permanent housing. The top African-American theatre company was finally able to move into a venue at 450 Post Street. Executive Director Quentin Easter stated that the company expected to stay at this theatre “for the foreseeable future."

However disaster stuck and "[i]n a major setback for a company that seemed to be overcoming its difficulties, the Lorraine Hansberry Theatre...canceled the rest of its season and [withdrew] from its recently announced lease of the former Post Street Theatre. The moves were necessitated by the hospitalization of its founders, Artistic Director Stanley E. Williams and Executive Director Quentin Easter, according to an announcement posted on the company's website.

Homeless since 2007, when it lost the 300-seat Sutter Street theater it had occupied since 1988, the region's premier African-American company seemed poised to move up the prestige ladder when it announced its move into the 729-seat Post Street space in January 2010. It opened there in February with the gospel musical Mahalia.

Today, the theater is located in the San Francisco African American Historical and Cultural Society at 762 Fulton St which sits at the northeast corner of Webster St and Fulton St. between the Fillmore District and Hayes Valley.

Loss of co-founder 
"(Quentin) Easter co-founded Lorraine Hansberry Theatre with Stanley E. Williams in 1981, and served as its Executive Director since that time. He supervised the renovation and relocation of the theater to its former home at 620 Sutter Street — a one-half-million-dollar project which established Lorraine Hansberry Theatre as the first African-American Arts institution to be located in the high-profile theatre district of downtown San Francisco. Mr. Easter served as a panelist for the California Arts Council's Theatre Program, Multicultural Entry Level Program, and Multicultural Advancement Program. He was saluted by KGO-TV 7 in 1990 with its 'Profiles in Excellence' Award; by KQED-TV in 2007 with its 'Local Heroes Award' for community involvement, leadership, and accomplishments. Other awards include the National Council of Negro Women Special Service Award 2006; San Francisco Black Pride Reggie Williams Achievement Award 2006; and the Thurgood Marshall College Fund Award of Excellence 2008. Under his direction, Lorraine Hansberry Theatre was honored with the Bay Area Critics' Circle's Paine Knickerbocker Award, for continued contributions to Bay Area theatre."

The remainder of the season featured Stick Fly by Lydia R. Diamond (The Bluest Eye) and leading local actor Margo Hall in Fabulation by Pulitzer Prize winner Lynn Nottage (Ruined, Intimate Apparel). The first signs of trouble came with the postponement of Stick Fly from March until a later date.

New Artistic Director 
In September of 2020 The Lorraine Hansberry Theatre welcomed a new artistic director. The first female director for the theatre, Margo Hall. Margo has been active in theatre in the Bay area for over 30 years, with connections to the theatre throughout the span of her career.

References

African-American theatre companies
Theatre companies in San Francisco
Theatres in San Francisco
African Americans in California
Performing groups established in 1981
1981 establishments in California